Cindy Franssen (born 30 January 1976) is a Belgian politician of the Christian Democratic and Flemish (CD&V) who was elected as a Member of the European Parliament in 2019.

Franssen has since been serving on the Committee on Employment and Social Affairs and the Committee on Women's Rights and Gender Equality. She later also joined the Special Committee on Beating Cancer (2020) and the Special Committee on the COVID-19 pandemic (2022).  

In addition to her committee assignments, Franssen is part of the Parliament's delegation for relations with India. She is also part of the European Parliament Intergroup on Fighting against Poverty, the European Parliament Intergroup on Trade Unions, the European Parliament Intergroup on Disability and the MEPs Against Cancer group.

References

1976 births
Living people
MEPs for Belgium 2019–2024
21st-century women MEPs for Belgium
Christian Democratic and Flemish MEPs
Christian Democratic and Flemish politicians
Ghent University alumni
People from Oudenaarde
21st-century Belgian women politicians
21st-century Belgian politicians
Bearers of the Leopold Order